Michel Hénon (23 July 1931, Paris – 7 April 2013, Nice) was a French mathematician and astronomer. He worked for a long time at the Nice Observatory.

In astronomy, Hénon is well known for his contributions to stellar dynamics. In the late 1960s and early 1970s he made important contributions on the dynamical evolution of star clusters, in particular globular clusters. He developed a numerical technique using Monte Carlo methods to follow the dynamical evolution of a spherical star cluster much faster than the so-called n-body methods. 

In mathematics, he is well known for the Hénon map, a simple discrete dynamical system that exhibits chaotic behavior.

He published a two-volume work on the restricted three-body problem.

In 1978 he was awarded the Prix Jean Ricard.

See also
N-body units

References

External links
 Hénon's publications (a partial list from NASA Astrophysics Data System).
 A discussion of Hénon's equation, contains further links.
 Simulation of Hénon map in javascript (experiences.math.cnrs.fr).

1931 births
2013 deaths
Chaos theorists
20th-century French astronomers
20th-century French mathematicians